Bianca Manacorda (born 17 November 1997) is an Italian pair skater. With her former skating partner, Niccolò Macii, she won silver at an ISU Challenger Series event, the 2014 Lombardia Trophy, and placed 12th at the 2016 European Championships in Bratislava, Slovakia. They also competed at three World Junior Championships, achieving their best result, 6th, at the 2016 event in Debrecen, Hungary.

Programs 
(with Macii)

Competitive highlights 
CS: Challenger Series; JGP: Junior Grand Prix

With Macii

References

External links 

 

1997 births
Italian female pair skaters
Living people
Figure skaters from Milan
20th-century Italian women
21st-century Italian women